
The year 506 BC was a year of the pre-Julian Roman calendar. In the Roman Empire it was known as the Year of the Consulship of Rufus and Aquilinus (or, less frequently, year 248  Ab urbe condita). The denomination 506 BC for this year has been used since the early medieval period, when the Anno Domini calendar era became the prevalent method in Europe for naming years.

Events

By place

China 
Battle of Boju—During the Spring and Autumn period of ancient China, forces of the state of Wu under Sun Tzu decisively defeat forces of the state of Chu, destroying the Chu capital of Ying and forcing King Zhao to flee.

Births
Kōshō, emperor of Japan (d. 393 BC)
Yan Yan, a disciple of Confucius

Deaths
Shen Yin Shu, general of the State of Chu

References